Clelea is a genus of moths of the family Zygaenidae.

Selected species
Clelea chala (Moore, 1859)
Clelea formosana Strand, 1915
Clelea pravata (Moore, 1859)
Clelea sapphirina Walker, 1854, type species 
Clelea syriaca Hampson, 1919

References

Procridinae
Zygaenidae genera